Bergeforsen is a locality situated in Timrå Municipality, Västernorrland County, Sweden with 1,563 inhabitants in 2010.

References 

Populated places in Timrå Municipality
Medelpad